Rage & Sorrow is the second extended play by American musician Breland. Released on June 19, 2020 for Juneteenth. The EP touches on the then ongoing George Floyd protests, as well as structural racism and repressed emotions.

Background and composition 
The day after the murder of George Floyd, Breland wrote the song "The Message". Rage & Sorrow was released on Juneteenth, a holiday celebrating the end of slavery, amid the George Floyd protests. In an Instagram post, Breland stated

Breland stated in an interview with Billboard that Rage & Sorrow "felt really good to put out", and that he wanted show both the rage and sorrow of the energy of the George Floyd protests, and show the importance of balance.

The EP consists of three tracks, "Intro", "A Message", and "Real Men Don't Cry". "Intro" is a short, mainly spoken word track, in which Breland talks about the history of racism in the United States. "A Message" is a one minute rap song "filled with aggression" with a "bare-knuckle" beat. The song discusses the George Floyd protests and encourages fans to advocate for change, and has been described to be a "call to do better" and "a musical 'I told you so'". Both "Intro" and "A Message" sample the song Tobacco Road. The final song, "Real Men Don't Cry" is a piano ballad with falsetto vocals and R&B influences about repressed emotions and masculinity in the context of the George Floyd protests. It was written prior to the George Floyd protests.

Track listing

References 

2020 EPs
Atlantic Records EPs